The Parking Spot is an off airport parking company based in Chicago, Illinois. Founded in 1998 by Martin Nesbitt with initial backing by Penny Pritzker, The Parking Spot was sold in 2011 for $360 Million to Lake Forest-based private equity group Green Courte Partners LLC. According to The Parking Spot's website, as of 2019 the company has 39 locations at 23 airports. In August 2019, The Parking Spot announced a preferred partnership with SpotHero.

Locations

Atlanta - 2 locations
Austin - 2 locations
Baltimore
Buffalo
Charlotte
Columbus
Dallas (DFW) - 3 locations
Dallas (Love Field) - 2 locations
Denver
Hartford
Houston - 3 locations
Houston - 3 locations
Kansas City
Los Angeles - 2 locations
Nashville
New York (LaGuardia)
Newark - 2 locations
Orlando
Philadelphia
Phoenix - 2 locations
Pittsburgh
Salt Lake City
St. Louis - 4 locations

References

External links

Parking companies
American companies established in 1998
Transport companies established in 1998
Companies based in Chicago